James Enright (born 28 April 1964) is a Canadian Paralympic athlete who competed in athletics and wheelchair basketball. In the 1988 Summer Paralympics he competed in athletics and received a silver medal for his loss in the men's javelin followed by a winning bronze medal performance in men's high jump. Quit 10 year athletics career after culmination of vision to experience growth of team dynamics in wheelchair basketball. Selected to National Team in 1990 and competed for fifth-place finishes at both the 1992 Summer Paralympics (co-captain) and 1996 Summer Paralympics (captain) in the wheelchair basketball competitions. Attended 2000 Summer Paralympics as Team Manager with an undefeated record to win the gold medal. He was elected in 1995 as the Men's National Team Rep and held position until retiring in 2000,

References

1964 births
Athletes (track and field) at the 1988 Summer Paralympics
Living people
Paralympic silver medalists for Canada
Paralympic bronze medalists for Canada
Sportspeople from Gatineau
Wheelchair basketball players at the 1992 Summer Paralympics
Wheelchair basketball players at the 1996 Summer Paralympics
Medalists at the 1988 Summer Paralympics
Paralympic medalists in athletics (track and field)
Paralympic track and field athletes of Canada
Canadian male high jumpers
Canadian male javelin throwers
High jumpers with limb difference
Javelin throwers with limb difference
Paralympic high jumpers
Paralympic javelin throwers
20th-century Canadian people
21st-century Canadian people